Rova is a village east of Radomlje in the Municipality of Domžale in the Upper Carniola region of Slovenia.

Church

The local parish church is built on a small hill north of the settlement and is dedicated to Saint Catherine of Alexandria.

References

External links

Rova on Geopedia

Populated places in the Municipality of Domžale